Kadappattoor is a small village on the banks of Meenachil river near Pala in Kottayam district of Kerala. Kadappattoor, is located 30 km east of Kottayam. The village life is centered on the Shiva Kadappattoor Mahadeva Temple (also Kadappatoor Temple or "Katappattur Temple" or "Kadapattur Mahadeva Temple") The population consists of Hindus and Christians.

History
The unique stone idol of Lord Shiva in the temple is unlike the idols in other Shiva temples. This is the only Shiva temple in Kerala where Lord Shiva is worshipped in a Swaroopa Vigraha (idol). In all other Shiva temples Lord is worshipped in Linga form. The idol was discovered by a woodcutter named Madathil Paachu Nair inside a large tree (Country Fig - Ficus Glomerata) on the banks of Meenachil river on 14 July 1960 while he was cutting firewood. The day was quite unusually stormy with deafening thunderbolts. The woodcutter was frightened and jumped into the river as the tree fell to one side and the stone idol of Shiva appeared from that.

Shiva Idol
The news of appearance of a Shiva idol from the tree spread through central Travancore and people flocked to see the idol. Gradually a temple was built, initially in a unique architectural design resembling North Indian temples.

In 2006 the Katappattoor temple was renovated and completely remodeled in South Indian temple architecture style.  Now the temple has a three storied big rectangular sreekovil with copper covered pyramidal roof and golden thazhikakkudam. The sreekovil walls are decorated with sculptures. The namaskaramandapam also has a copper covered pyramidal roof and golden thazhikakkudam. People belonging to all religions are allowed entry into this temple.

Pilgrims
Thousands of pilgrims visit the Kadappattoor temple every year, on their way to Sabarimala. It is an important Idathavalam (pilgrimage shelter) for the Sabarimala pilgrims. The excellent facilities for staying in a serene atmosphere with ample space around the temple attracts Sabarimla pilgrims to this temple. Elaborate arrangements are provided for the pilgrims by the temple authorities. Alangad Sangham, a major participant of famous Erumely Pettathullal (a devotional dance, performed by the pilgrims) will rest here for a day on their way to Erumely. They will perform the Paanaka Pooja at this temple on Dhanu 26th (January ).

Legends 

According to legends the Meenachil river originates from the Kamandalu of Gauna Maharshi (Sage Gauna) like the river Kaveri from Agasthya Maharshi's Kamandalu. Hence this river got the name Gauna Nadi. Gauna Maharshi filled his Kamandalu with Sapthanadi Theertham (water from the 7 holy rivers - the Ganges, Yamuna, Saraswathy, Sindhu, Narmmada, Godavari and Kaveri). A beautiful idol of Lord Subrahmanya was also there in his kamandalu. He was eagerly waiting for the Darshan of Lord Sree Rama who was in his return journey to Ayodhya after killing Ravana. Sree Rama was accompanied by a large number of devotees like Vibhishana, Sugreeva, Hanuman and Angada in the Pushpaka Vimana. So Maharshi Gauna could not see Lord Sri Rama and Sita Devi properly. Sage Gauna, angry and disappointed, threw the kamandalu away and the idol of Subrahmanya Swami came out. These incidents occurred on a hill and since then the hill is known as Kudamuruttimala. This flow of water became a river and thus the present Gauna nadi was formed. Along with the flow of the water, the idol was carried away to the Vishnu temple in Kidangoor and was later installed in a new sreekovil. This is the present Kidangoor Subrahmanya Swami Temple. So the water in Gauna river is as holy as the Sapthanadi Teertham.

Later Sree Rama and Sitha Devi gave darshan to Gauna Maharshi. Rama advised Gauna Maharshi to continue his Tapas and gave him a beautiful idol of Lord Shiva. Gauna Maharsi then started his journey along the river bank and at last reached a beautiful village and decided to stay there. He started worshipping Lord Shiva there. The local people were his ardent devotees and they provided him all assistance for Shiva pooja. Hence Gauna Maharshi named this place as 'Kadappetta ooru'. Later Gauna Maharshi went to Shivaloka. After that this place became a great forest. This place is now famous as Kadappattoor and the idol of Shiva worshipped by Gauna Maharshi is now famous as Lord Kadappattoorappan.

References

Villages in Kottayam district